Oroks (Ороки in Russian; self-designation: Ulta, Ulcha), sometimes called Uilta, are a people in the Sakhalin Oblast (mainly the eastern part of the island) in Russia. The Orok language belongs to the Southern group of the Tungusic language family. According to the 2002 Russian census, there were 346 Oroks living in Northern Sakhalin by the Okhotsk Sea and Southern Sakhalin in the district by the city of Poronaysk. According to the 2010 census there were 295 Oroks in Russia.

Etymology
The name Orok is believed to derive from the exonym Oro given by a Tungusic group meaning "a domestic reindeer". The Orok self-designation endonym is Ul'ta, probably from the root Ula (meaning "domestic reindeer" in Orok). Another self-designation is Nani. Occasionally, the Oroks, as well as the Orochs and Udege, are erroneously called Orochons. The Uilta Association in Japan claims that the term Orok has a derogatory connotation.

Population and settlement
The total number of Oroks in Russia, according to the 2002 Russian Census, is 346 people. They live mostly in Sakhalin Oblast. Most of the Oroks are concentrated in three settlements – Poronaysk, Nogliki and the village of Val, Nogliksky District. A total of 144 Oroks live in Val. Other places in which the Orok people live include: the villages of Gastello and Vakhrushev in Poronaysky District; the village of Viakhtu in Alexandrovsk-Sakhalinsky District; the village of Smirnykh, Smirnykhovsky District; Okhinsky District; and Yuzhno-Sakhalinsk, the administrative center of Sakhalin Oblast.

Furthermore, Orok people live on the island of Hokkaido, Japan – in 1989, there was a community of about 20 people near the city of Abashiri. Their number is currently unknown.

History
Orok oral tradition indicates that the Oroks share history with the Ulch people, and that they migrated to Sakhalin from the area of the Amgun River in mainland Russia. Research indicates that this migration probably took place in the 17th century at the latest.

The Russian Empire gained complete control over Orok lands after the 1858 Treaty of Aigun and 1860 Convention of Peking. A penal colony was established on Sakhalin between 1857 and 1906, bringing large numbers of Russian criminals and political exiles, including Lev Sternberg, an important early ethnographer on Oroks and the island's other indigenous people, the Nivkhs and Ainu. Before Soviet collectivization in the 1920s, the Orok were divided into five groups, each with their own migratory zone. However, following the Bolshevik Revolution in 1922, the new government of the Soviet Union altered prior imperial policies towards the Oroks to bring them into line with communist ideology. In 1932, the northern Oroks joined the collective farm of Val, which was specialised in reindeer breeding, together with smaller numbers of Nivkhs, Evenks and Russians.

Following the Russo-Japanese War, southern Sakhalin came under the control of the Empire of Japan, which administered it as Karafuto Prefecture. The Uilta, or Oroks, were classified as "Karafuto natives" (樺太土人), and were not entered into Japanese-style family registers, in contrast to the Ainu, who had "mainland Japan" family registers. Like the Karafuto Koreans and the Nivkh, but unlike the Ainu, the Uilta were thus not included in the evacuation of Japanese nationals after the Soviet invasion in 1945. Some Nivkhs and Uilta who served in the Imperial Japanese Army were held in Soviet work camps; after court cases in the late 1950s and 1960s, they were recognised as Japanese nationals and thus permitted to migrate to Japan. Most settled around Abashiri, Hokkaidō. The Uilta Kyokai of Japan was founded to fight for Uilta rights and the preservation of Uilta traditions in 1975 by Dahinien Gendanu.

Language and culture

The Orok language belongs to the Southern group of the Tungusic language family. At present, 64 people of the Sakhalin Oroks speak the Orok language, and all Oroks also speak Russian. An alphabetic script, based on Cyrillic, was introduced in 2007. A primer has been published, and the language is taught in one school on Sakhalin.

The Oroks share cultural and linguistic links with other Tungusic peoples, but before the arrival of Russians, they differed economically from similar peoples due to their herding of reindeer. Reindeer provided the Oroks, particularly in northern Sakhalin, with food, clothing, and transportation. The Oroks also practiced fishing and hunting. The arrival of Russians has had a major effect on Orok culture, and most Oroks today live sedentary lifestyles. Some northern Oroks still practice semi-nomadic herding alongside vegetable farming and cattle ranching; in the south, the leading occupations are fishing and industrial labor.

Rites of Passage
The Orok boys, when it came of time, would usually participate in a Sturgeon Hunt, usually hunting for the Beluga or Kaluga Sturgeon variants. This involved a lone Orok going out, with only a small supply of food (usually enough to last him a week) and armed with a special type of spear. Once the sturgeon was killed, the hunter would take one of the predator's teeth and carve a mark in his forehead or arm, which indicated that the hunt was successful. Due to the fish's size, strength and fierceness, failure to successfully kill the Sturgeon usually resulted in the hunter's death.

Notes

References

Further reading
Missonova, Lyudmila I. (2009). The Main Spheres of Activities of Sakhalin Uilta: Survival Experience in the Present-Day Context. Sibirica: Interdisciplinary Journal of Siberian Studies, 8:2, 71–87. Abstract available here (retrieved November 9, 2009).
 Ороки. -- Народы Сибири, Москва—Ленинград 1956.
 Т. Петрова, Язык ороков (ульта), Москва 1967.
 А. В. Смоляк, Южные ороки. -- Советская этнография 1, 1965.
 А. В. Смоляк, Этнические процессы у народов Нижнего Амура и Сахалина, Москва 1975.

External links

Oroks in the Red Book of the Peoples of the Russian Empire

 
Ethnic groups in Japan
Ethnic groups in Siberia
Indigenous peoples of North Asia
Tungusic peoples
Sakhalin Oblast
Sakhalin
Indigenous small-numbered peoples of the North, Siberia and the Far East